The Second Cabinet of Alexis Tsipras was sworn in on 23 September 2015, following the Greek legislative election in September 2015. Alexis Tsipras, leader of Syriza, was sworn in as Prime Minister of Greece on 21 September, having agreed to re-form the coalition with Panos Kammenos and the Independent Greeks.

On 16 June 2018 the Hellenic Parliament rejected motion of no confidence against the government with a 127-153 vote.

Background

The First Cabinet of Alexis Tsipras was formed following the legislative election in January 2015, and was a coalition of Syriza and the Independent Greeks. Most notably, the government had to deal with the Greek government-debt crisis, but was also responsible for the early July bailout referendum. Throughout the duration of their term, their main responsibility was re-negotiating the terms of the third bailout package.

During the vote on the third bailout package in the Hellenic Parliament, a number of Syriza MPs voted against the package resulting in the government officially losing its majority. For this reason, Tsipras and the government resigned on 20 August and called for a snap election to take place on 20 September. Prokopis Pavlopoulos, the President of Greece had to allow for all the opposition parties to attempt to form a government of their own, but none of them had sufficient numbers of MPs. Subsequently, a caretaker cabinet led by Vassiliki Thanou-Christophilou was formed on 27 August to lead the country into the election.

During the election campaign period, opinion polls had suggested that Syriza and New Democracy, led by Vangelis Meimarakis, were neck and neck, with some polls showing New Democracy ahead and others showing Syriza ahead. The exit polls generally showed that Syriza was on 30-34%, and New Democracy was on 28.5-32.5%.

Formation

At approximately 12:00 GMT on 21 September, Tsipras met with Panos Kammenos, his former coalition partner, at the Syriza party HQ in Athens. At the meeting, they discussed the make-up of the new cabinet.

Composition

Prime Minister

Ministerial responsibilities

Alternate Ministers are directly assigned special responsibilities and powers by the prime minister, including:
 full parliamentary powers and, in conjunction with the minister, the legislative initiative 
 the right to issue individual and normative acts, and to propose individual and normative decrees

Full ministers however retain:
 the identification of ministerial policy in the cabinet
 the representation in bodies of the European Union
 the appointment of administrative agencies, public services and personnel

Deputy ministers are assigned with responsibilities and powers by the prime minister and the full minister they report to.

Ministers of State

Bold denotes full ministers attending the weekly cabinet council.
a Deputy ministers are not members of the cabinet but may attend cabinet meetings.
References:

References

Tsipras
Cabinets established in 2015
2015 in Greek politics
2015 establishments in Greece
Coalition governments
Greek government-debt crisis
Syriza
Alexis Tsipras
Independent Greeks
Cabinets disestablished in 2019
2019 disestablishments in Greece